Irene F. Hughes (May 19, 1920 – December 7, 2012) was an American psychic.

She was a favorite guest on The Merv Griffin Show. She also made regular appearances on Regis Philbin's Saturday Night in St. Louis and A.M. Los Angeles. Her clients included Eva Gabor and Howard Hughes.

References

External links

1920 births
2012 deaths
American psychics
People from Crete, Illinois
People from Hardeman County, Tennessee
People from Chicago Heights, Illinois